Dul-e Gap (also Romanized as Dūl-e Gap) is a village in Seyyedvaliyeddin Rural District, Sardasht District, Dezful County, Khuzestan Province, Iran. At the 2006 census, its population was 50, in 9 families.

References 

Populated places in Dezful County